Heather J. Hutt (born April 5, 1959) is an American politician who is currently serving as a councilmember representing the 10th District of Los Angeles since September 2, 2022. She was previously a candidate for California's 54th State Assembly district in 2021 and served as a California State Director for then-Senator Kamala Harris from 2019 to 2020.

Early political career 
In 2011, Hutt was hired as a District Director for Assemblymember Isadore Hall III, which she continued following Hall's election to the California State Senate. In February 2017, Hutt was named the Regional Deputy Director for then-Senator Kamala Harris. On March 28, 2019, Harris announced new hires for senior roles, to which Hutt was hired as the California State Director.

On February 1, 2022, Hutt announced that she would be running for California's 54th State Assembly district after it was vacated by Sydney Kamlager's election to the California State Senate. She was endorsed by politicians such as Janice Hahn, Yvonne Brathwaite Burke, and Maxine Waters. In the election, she was led by Isaac Bryan in the initial count, and lost the special primary to Bryan on May 18, 2021.

Los Angeles City Council 

In March 2022, Hutt was appointed by councilmember Herb Wesson to be his chief of staff for District 10 after he fired the previous chief of staff and former caretaker of the district, Karly Katona. Hutt's appointment was historic as she is the first African American woman to serve as chief of staff since 1973, when Maxine Waters was chief deputy to David S. Cunningham Jr. In July 2022, California Attorney General Rob Bonta granted activists against Wesson's appointment to sue, and Wesson was blocked from serving as councilmember; Council President Nury Martinez appointed Hutt as a caretaker of the district.

After a month of no representation, residents of District 10 asked for voting privileges for Hutt to give them a voice in the City Council. On August 26, 2022, Martinez introduced a motion to appoint Hutt as a councilmember, which was seconded by four other members. The motion was opposed by Marqueece Harris-Dawson and Mike Bonin, who instead proposed instructing the City Attorney to find eligibility requirements for appointments. On August 30, the vote to instate Hutt as a councilmember fell one vote short, with five voting for and five voting against; it was refereed to the Rules, Elections and Intergovernmental Relations Committee for further discussion. The Committee cleared her for reconsideration by the Council the next day, and Hutt was confirmed by the Council in the next meeting and sworn in on September 2, 2022.

Electoral history

References 

Los Angeles City Council members
African-American city council members in California
California Democrats
1959 births
People from South Los Angeles
Politicians from Los Angeles
21st-century African-American politicians
Living people
21st-century African-American women
21st-century American politicians
21st-century American women politicians
African-American women in politics